:Ireland is an island in Northern Europe in the north Atlantic Ocean. The island lies on the European continental shelf, part of the Eurasian Plate. The island's main geographical features include low central plains surrounded by coastal mountains. The western coastline is rugged, with many islands, peninsulas, headlands and bays. There are a number of sizeable lakes along Ireland's rivers, of which Lough Neagh is the largest.

Politically, the island consists of the Republic of Ireland, with jurisdiction over about five-sixths of the island, and Northern Ireland, a constituent country of the United Kingdom, with jurisdiction over the remaining sixth. It is separated from Great Britain by the Irish Sea and from mainland Europe by the Celtic Sea.
Ireland forms the second largest landmass in the North-West European Archipelago, together with nearby islands including Great Britain and the Isle of Man, known in the United Kingdom as the British Isles.

Geological development

The geology of Ireland is diverse. Different regions contain rocks belonging to different geological periods, dating back almost 2 billion years. The oldest known Irish rock is about 1.7 billion years old and is found on Inishtrahull Island off the north coast of Inishowen and on the mainland at Annagh Head on the Mullet Peninsula. The newer formations are the drumlins and glacial valleys as a result of the last ice age, and the sinkholes and cave formations in the limestone regions of Clare.

Ireland's geological history covers everything from volcanism and tropical seas to the last glacial period. Ireland was formed in two distinct parts and slowly joined, uniting about 440 million years ago. As a result of tectonics and the effect of ice, the sea level has risen and fallen. In every area of the country the rocks which formed can be seen as a result. Finally, the impact of the glaciers shaped the landscape seen today. The variation between the two areas, along with the differences between volcanic areas and shallow seas, led to a range of soils. There are extensive bogs and free-draining brown earths. The mountains are granite, sandstone, limestone with karst areas, and basalt formations.

Most of Ireland was probably above sea level during the last 60 million years. As such its landscapes have been shaped by erosion and weathering on land. Protracted erosion also means most of the Paleogene and Neogene sediments have been eroded away or, as known in a few cases, buried by Quaternary deposits. Before the Quaternary glaciations affected Ireland the landscape had developed thick weathered regolith on the uplands and karst in the lowlands. There has been some controversy regarding the origin of the planation surfaces found in Ireland. While some have argued for an origin in marine planation others regard these surfaces as peneplains formed by weathering and fluvial erosion. Not only is their origin disputed but also their actual extent and the relative role of sea-level change and tectonics in their shaping. Most river systems in Ireland formed in the Cenozoic before the Quaternary glaciations. Rivers follow for most of their course structural features of the geology of Ireland. Marine erosion since the Miocene may have made Ireland's western coast retreat more than 100 km. Pre-Quaternary relief was more dramatic than today's glacier-smoothened landscapes.

Physical geography

Mountain ranges

Ireland consists of a mostly flat low-lying area in the Midlands, ringed by mountain ranges such as (beginning in County Kerry and working counter-clockwise) the MacGillycuddy's Reeks, Comeragh Mountains, Blackstairs Mountains, Wicklow Mountains, the Mournes, Glens of Antrim, Sperrin Mountains, Bluestack Mountains, Derryveagh Mountains, Ox Mountains, Nephinbeg Mountains and the Twelve Bens/Maumturks group. Some mountain ranges are further inland in the south of Ireland, such as the Galtee Mountains (the highest inland range), Silvermine and Slieve Bloom Mountains. Ireland is sometimes known as the "Emerald Isle" because of its green landscape.

Forests
Ireland, like the neighbouring Great Britain, was once covered in forest. Clearing of forests began in the Neolithic Age and accelerated following the Tudor Conquest, resulting in forest cover of only 1% by the start of the twentieth century. As of 2017, total tree cover in the Republic of Ireland stood at 11% of land area. The figure for native forest stood at 2% in 2018; the third lowest in Europe behind Iceland and Malta.

Rivers and lakes

The Shannon crosses 11 counties and divides the west of Ireland from the south and east. The river develops into three large lakes along its course, Lough Allen, Lough Ree, and Lough Derg. The River Shannon enters the Atlantic Ocean at Limerick city along the Shannon Estuary. Other major rivers include the River Liffey, River Lee, River Blackwater, River Nore, River Suir, River Barrow, River Bann, River Foyle, River Erne, and River Boyne.

The largest lake in the Republic of Ireland is Lough Corrib . Other large lakes include Lough Erne, Lough Mask and Lough Conn.

Inlets

In County Donegal, Lough Swilly separates the western side of the Inishowen peninsula. Lough Foyle on the other side, is one of Ireland's larger inlets, situated between County Donegal and County Londonderry. Clockwise round the coast is Belfast Lough, between County Antrim and County Down. Also in County Down is Strangford Lough, actually an inlet partially separating the Ards peninsula from the mainland. Further south, Carlingford Lough is situated between Down and County Louth.

Dublin Bay is the next sizeable inlet. The east coast of Ireland has no major inlets until Wexford Harbour at the mouth of the River Slaney. On the south coast, Waterford Harbour is situated at the mouth of the River Suir (into which the other two of the Three Sisters (River Nore and River Barrow) flow). The next major inlet is Cork Harbour, at the mouth of the River Lee, in which Great Island is situated.

Dunmanus Bay, Kenmare estuary and Dingle Bay are all inlets between the peninsulas of County Kerry. North of these is the Shannon Estuary. Between north County Clare and County Galway is Galway Bay. Clew Bay is located on the coast of County Mayo, south of Achill Island, while Broadhaven Bay, Blacksod Bay and Sruth Fada Conn bays are situated in northwest Connacht, in North Mayo. Killala Bay is on the northeast coast of Mayo. Donegal Bay is a major inlet between County Donegal and County Sligo.

A recent global remote sensing analysis suggested that there were 565 km2 of tidal flats in Ireland, making it the 43rd ranked country in terms of tidal flat area.

Headlands
Malin Head is the most northerly point in Ireland, while Mizen Head is one of the most southern points, hence the term "from Malin to Mizen" (or the reverse) is used for anything applying to the island of Ireland as a whole. Carnsore Point is another extreme point of Ireland, being the southeasternmost point of Ireland. Hook Head and the Old Head of Kinsale are two of many headlands along the south coast. Loop Head is the headland at which County Clare comes to a point on the west coast of Ireland, with the Atlantic on the north, and the Shannon estuary to the south. Hag's Head is another headland further up Clare's north/western coastline, with the Cliffs of Moher along the coastline north of the point. Erris Head is the northwesternmost point of Connacht.

Islands and peninsulas

Apart from Ireland itself, Achill Island to its northwest is now considered the largest island in the group. The island is inhabited, and is connected to the mainland by a bridge. Some of the next largest islands are the Aran Islands, off the coast of southern Connacht, host to an Irish-speaking community, or Gaeltacht. Valentia Island off the Iveragh peninsula is also one of Ireland's larger islands, and is relatively settled, as well as being connected by a bridge at its southeastern end.  Omey Island, off the coast of Connemara is a tidal island.

Some of the best-known peninsulas in Ireland are in County Kerry; the Dingle peninsula, the Iveragh peninsula and the Beara peninsula. The Ards peninsula is one of the larger peninsulas outside Kerry. The Inishowen peninsula in County Donegal includes Ireland's most northerly point, Malin Head and several important towns including Buncrana on Lough Swilly, Carndonagh and Moville on Lough Foyle. Ireland's most northerly land feature is Inishtrahull island, off Malin Head. Rockall Island may deserve this honour but its status is disputed, being claimed by the United Kingdom, Republic of Ireland, Denmark (for the Faroe Islands) and Iceland. The most southerly point is the Fastnet Rock.

The Hebrides off Scotland and Anglesey off Wales were grouped with Ireland ("Hibernia") by the Greco-Roman geographer Ptolemy, but this is no longer common.

Climate

The climate of Ireland is mild, humid and changeable with abundant rainfall and a lack of temperature extremes. Ireland's climate is defined as a temperate oceanic climate, or Cfb on the Köppen climate classification system, a classification it shares with most of northwest Europe.  The country receives generally warm summers and mild winters. It is considerably warmer than other areas at the same latitude on the other side of the Atlantic, such as in Newfoundland, because it lies downwind of the Atlantic Ocean. It is also warmer than maritime climates near the same latitude, such as the Pacific Northwest as a result of heat released by the Atlantic overturning circulation that includes the North Atlantic Current and Gulf Stream. For comparison, Dublin is 9 °C warmer than St. John's in Newfoundland in winter and 4 °C warmer than Seattle in the Pacific Northwest in winter.

The influence of the North Atlantic Current also ensures the coastline of Ireland remains ice-free throughout the winter. The climate in Ireland does not experience extreme weather, with tornadoes and similar weather features being rare. However, Ireland is prone to eastward moving cyclones which come in from the North Atlantic.

The prevailing wind comes from the southwest, breaking on the high mountains of the west coast. Rainfall is therefore a particularly prominent part of western Irish life, with Valentia Island, off the west coast of County Kerry, getting over twice as much annual rainfall as Dublin on the east ( vs. ).

January and February are the coldest months of the year, and mean daily air temperatures fall between  during these months. The sunniest months are May and June, with an average of five to seven hours sunshine per day.

Though extreme weather events in Ireland are comparatively rare when compared with other countries in the European Continent, they do occur.

The tables below show mean 30-year climate averages for Ireland's two largest cities, taken from the weather stations at Dublin Airport and Belfast International Airport respectively. The state metrological service for the Republic of Ireland is Met Éireann, while the Met Office monitors climate data for Northern Ireland.

Political and human geography

Ireland is divided into four provinces, Connacht, Leinster, Munster and Ulster, and 32 counties. Six of the nine Ulster counties form Northern Ireland and the other 26 form the state, Ireland. The map shows the county boundaries for all 32 counties.

From an administrative viewpoint, 21 of the counties in the Republic are units of local government. The other six have more than one local council area, resulting in a total of 31 county-level authorities. County Tipperary had two ridings, North Tipperary and South Tipperary, originally established in 1838, renamed in 2001 and amalgamated in 2014. The cities of Dublin, Cork and Galway have city councils and are administered separately from the counties bearing those names. The cities of Limerick and Waterford were merged with their respective county councils in 2014 to form new city and county councils. The remaining part of County Dublin is divided into Dún Laoghaire–Rathdown, Fingal, and South Dublin.

Electoral areas in Ireland (the state) are called constituencies in accordance with Irish law, mostly follow county boundaries. Maintaining links to the county system is a mandatory consideration in the re-organisation of constituency boundaries by a Constituency Commission.

In Northern Ireland, a major re-organisation of local government in 1973 replaced the six traditional counties and two county boroughs (Belfast and Derry) by 26 single-tier districts, which, apart from Fermanagh cross the traditional county boundaries. The six counties and two county-boroughs remain in use for purposes such as Lieutenancy. In November 2005, proposals were announced which would see the number of local authorities reduced to seven.
The island's total population of nearly 7 million people is concentrated in the east and south, particularly in Dublin, Belfast, Cork and their surrounding areas.

Natural resources

Bogs

Ireland has 12,000 km2 (about 4,600 sq miles) of bogland, consisting of two distinct types: blanket bogs and raised bogs. Blanket bogs are the more widespread of the two types. They are essentially a product of human activity aided by the moist Irish climate. Blanket bogs formed on sites where Neolithic farmers cleared trees for farming. As the land so cleared fell into disuse, the soil began to leach and become more acidic, producing a suitable environment for the growth of heather and rushes. The debris from these plants accumulated and a layer of peat formed. One of the largest expanses of Atlantic blanket bog in Ireland is to be found in County Mayo.

Raised bogs are most common in the Shannon basin. They formed when depressions left behind after the ice age filled with water to form lakes. Debris from reeds in these lakes formed a layer of at the bottom of the water. This eventually choked the lakes and raised above the surface, forming raised bogs.

Since the 17th century, peat has been cut for fuel for domestic heating and cooking, and it is called turf when so used. The process accelerated as commercial exploitation of bogs grew. In the 1940s, machines for cutting turf were introduced and larger-scale harvesting became possible. In the Republic, this became the responsibility of a semi-state company called Bord na Móna. In addition to domestic uses, commercially extracted turf is used in a number of industries, producing peat briquettes for domestic fuel and milled peat for electricity generation. More recently peat is being combined with biomass for dual-firing electricity generation.

In recent years, the destruction of bogs has raised environmental concerns. The issue is particularly acute for raised bogs which were more widely mined as they yield a higher-grade fuel than blanket bogs. Plans are now in place in both the Republic and Northern Ireland to conserve most of the remaining raised bogs on the island.

Oil, natural gas, renewables and minerals

Offshore exploration for natural gas began in 1970. The first major discovery was the Kinsale Head gas field in 1971. Next were the smaller Ballycotton gas field in 1989, and the Corrib gas field in 1996. Gas from these fields is pumped ashore and used for both domestic and industrial purposes. Ireland is the largest European producer of zinc, with one zinc-lead mine currently in operation at Tara, which is Europe's largest and deepest active mine. Other mineral deposits with actual or potential commercial value include gold, silver, gypsum, talc, calcite, dolomite, roofing slate, limestone aggregate, building stone, sand and gravel.

In March 2012 the first commercial oil well was drilled 70 km off the Cork coast by Providence Resources. The Barryroe oil well is yielding 3500 barrels per day; at current oil prices of $120 a barrel Barryroe oil well is worth in excess of €2.14bn annually.

See also

 Extreme points of Ireland
 Gravity Anomalies of Britain and Ireland
 Coastal landforms of Ireland
 Geographical centre of Ireland

Notes

References

Bibliography

Print
Mitchell, Frank and Ryan, Michael. Reading the Irish landscape (1998). 
Whittow, J. B. Geography and Scenery in Ireland (Penguin Books 1974)
Holland, Charles, H and Sanders, Ian S. The Geology of Ireland 2nd ed. (2009). 
 Place-names, Diarmuid O Murchadha and Kevin Murray, in The Heritage of Ireland, ed. N. Buttimer et al., The Collins Press, Cork, 2000, pp. 146–155.
 A paper landscape:the Ordnance Survey in nineteenth-century Ireland, J.H. Andrews, London, 1975
 Monasticon Hibernicum, M. Archdall, 1786
 Etymological aetiology in Irish tradition, R. Baumgarten, Eiru 41, pp. 115–122, 1990
 The Origin and History of Irish names of Places, Patrick Weston Joyce, three volumes, Dublin, 1869, 1875, 1913.
 Irish Place Names, D. Flanagan and L. Flanagan, Dublin, 1994
 Census of Ireland:general alphabetical index to the townlands and towns, parishes and paronies of Ireland, Dublin, 1861
 The Placenames of Westmeath, Paul Walsh, 1957
 The Placenames of Decies, P. Power, Cork, 1952
 The place-names of county Wicklow, Liam Price, seven volumes, Dublin, 1945–67

Online
Abbot, Patrick. Ireland's Peat Bogs. Retrieved on 23 January 2008.
Ireland – The World Factbook. Central Intelligence Agency. Retrieved on 23 January 2008.
OnlineWeather.com – climate details for Ireland. Retrieved 2011-01-12

External links
 OSI FAQ – lists of the longest, highest and other statistics
 A discussion on RTÉ Radio 1's science show Quantum Leap about the quality of GPS mapping in Ireland is available  here (archived link). The discussion starts 8mins 17sec into the show. It was aired on 18 Jan 2007 (archived link). Requires RealPlayer.